The 2005 Columbia Lions football team was an American football team that represented Columbia University during the 2005 NCAA Division I-AA football season. Columbia finished last in the Ivy League. 

In their third and final season under head coach Bob Shoop, the Lions compiled a 2–8 record and were outscored 337 to 116. Bill Beechum, Prosper Nwokocha and Joe Winters were the team captains.  

The Lions' winless (0–7) conference record placed eighth in the Ivy League standings. Columbia was outscored 293 to 63 by Ivy opponents. 

Columbia played its homes games at Lawrence A. Wien Stadium in Upper Manhattan, in New York City.

Schedule

References

Columbia
Columbia Lions football seasons
Columbia Lions football